Ashta is a city and a municipal council in Sangli district in the state of Maharashtra, India. It has an average elevation of 567 metres (1860 ft). The name "Ashta" comes from the legend that Lord Shri Ram established eight (Asht) Lord Mahadev temples in this area. The city is divided into 19 wards for which elections are held every 5 years. The Ashta Municipal Council has the population of 37,105 of which 19,171 are males while 17,934 are females as per the report released by Census India 2011.

Ashta is rapidly merging with Sangli city as a satellite suburb and will soon become part of Sangali Urban Agglomeration.
 
Population of Children with age of 0-6 is 3739 which is 10.08% of the total population of Ashta (M Cl). In Ashta Municipal Council, Female Sex Ratio is of 935 against state average of 929. Moreover, Child Sex Ratio in Ashta is around 869 compared to Maharashtra state average of 894. Literacy rate of Ashta city is 83.60% higher than state average of 82.34%. In Ashta, Male literacy is around 89.52% while female literacy rate is 77.32%.

Ashta Municipal Council has total administration over 7,709 houses to which it supplies basic amenities like water and sewerage. It is also authorized to build roads within Ashta Municipal Council limits and impose taxes on properties coming under its jurisdiction.

History 
It is said that Ashta is formally known as 'Sawalakhi Ashta'. There are eight linga (Ashtling) present in the town which are created by Lord Rama. That's why it is known as Ashta.

Education 

Annasaheb Dange College of Engineering & Technology is an autonomous engineering college, located in the city. It is located about 20 km from Sangli. The institute is NAAC-accredited and NBA-accredited.

Annasaheb Dange Ayurved Medical college

Annasaheb Dange college of B.Pharmacy

Arts & commerce college

M.G.V & junior college

K.B.P English Medium Sschool

New English School For Girls

Vilasrao Shinde Saheb Highschool Ashta

B.K.Chougule madhyamik vidyalaya Ashta

Navodit prathmik v madhyamik vidyalaya Ashta

Agriculture 

Sugar cane is the predominant crop grown by the farmers in Ashta. Ashta is among several towns in Sangli district which are considered part of larger sugar cane belt. It was hit by floods in 2019 affecting sugarcane production.

Industry 
Zanver Group of industries 
1) Ashta Liners Pvt Ltd
2) Kasturi Foundry Pvt Ltd

Transport

Railway 
Sangli & Kirloskarvadi  is the nearest big railway stations sangli : 18 km , Kirloskarvadi : 23km  from Ashta. Both stations are connected lines to major cities like Mumbai, Delhi, Pune, Bangalore, Ahmedabad, Surat, Vadodara, Mysuru, Hubli, Bhopal, Agra, Nagpur, Goa, Mangalore, Cochin by express trains. The nearest junction is Miraj junction connected via rail to India's major cities with express services to Pune, Mumbai, Bengaluru and New Delhi. Miraj is located on distance of 27 km from Ashta.

Road 
Ashta is located on New National Highway 166H and State Highway 151. The distance from Ashta to major cities are Kolhapur (40 km), Sangli (20 km), Pune (225 km), Mumbai (350 km).

Demographics 
As of 2011 India census, Ashta had a population of 37105. Male constitute 51% of the population and females 49%.

References 

Cities and towns in Sangli district